The 2016 Bursa Cup was a professional tennis tournament played on outdoor clay courts. It was the second edition of the tournament and part of the 2016 ITF Women's Circuit, offering a total of $50,000 in prize money. It took place in Bursa, Turkey, on 11–17 July 2016. However, due to the 2016 Turkish coup d'état attempt on July 15, the tournament was left abandoned without full completion of both singles and doubles events.

Singles main draw entrants

Seeds 

 1 Rankings as of 27 June 2016.

Other entrants 
The following player received a wildcard into the singles main draw:
  Berfu Cengiz
  Chiara Grimm
  İnci Öğüt
  Selin Övünç

The following players received entry from the qualifying draw:
  Cristina Adamescu
  Ganna Poznikhirenko
  Oana Georgeta Simion
  Milana Spremo

Champions

Singles

 Incompleted due to 2016 Turkish coup d'état attempt

Doubles

 Ekaterine Gorgodze /  Sofia Shapatava vs.  Akgul Amanmuradova /  Natela Dzalamidze, not played

External links 
 2016 Bursa Cup at ITFtennis.com
  

2016 ITF Women's Circuit
2016 in Turkish tennis
2016